The RV  TÜBİTAK Marmara is a Turkish research vessel owned by the Scientific and Technological Research Council of Turkey (TÜBİTAK) and operated by its newly established Marine Research Center for oceanographic research studies.

The vessel was designed by Soyaslan Marine, indigenously developed and built at the Çeksan Shipyard in Tuzla, Istanbul to a cost of   13.8 million. She was launched on February 17, 2013, in presence of  Minister of Science, Industry and Technology Nihat Ergün, Minister of Development Cevdet Yılmaz, Governor of Istanbul Hüseyin Avni Mutlu and President of TÜBİTAK Yücel Altunbaşak. She is the first ever research vessel built in Turkey.

It is planned that the vessel will be fitted until the end of May 2013 with all the necessary advanced-technology instruments and equipment. After commissioning, the research ship will be used in the seas around Turkey, primarily in the Turkish Straits, to study marine pollution, to research on marine biology, to explore underwater oil fields, to monitor underwater faults and underwater pipelines as well as to give support in case of marine incidents and disasters.

On board of the RV TÜBİTAK Marmara with twelve crew, eleven scientists will work in three laboratories.

Characteristics

See also
List of research vessels of Turkey

References

2013 ships
Ships built in Istanbul
Research vessels of Turkey
RV Marmara